The year 1516 in science and technology included many events, some of which are listed here.

Astronomy and space science
 The fall of the Nantan meteorite is possibly observed near the city of Nantan, Nandan County, Guangxi (China).

Exploration
 January – The Río de la Plata is first explored by Europeans when Spanish navigator Juan Díaz de Solís traverses it during his search for a passage between the Atlantic and Pacific Oceans.

Births
 March 26 – Conrad Gessner, Swiss naturalist (died 1565)
 November 5 – Martin Helwig, Silesian cartographer (died 1574)
 Realdo Colombo, Italian anatomist (died 1559)

Deaths
 December 13 – Johannes Trithemius, German scholar and cryptographer (born 1462)

References

 
16th century in science
1510s in science